An academy is an institution of secondary education or higher learning, research, or honorary membership.

Academy may also refer to:

Education
 Academy (English school), formerly known as city academy, type of publicly financed but independently run school
 Academy, one of the school organizational models
 French regional academies overseeing education
 Military academy
 Platonic Academy, the original Academy founded by the philosopher Plato in ancient Greece circa 385 BCE
 Scottish school naming, in Scotland, a quarter of the secondary schools have the word "academy" in their name

National language regulators 
 Académie française, the French Academy, pre-eminent French learned body on matters pertaining to the French language, officially established in 1635
 Accademia della Crusca, the Italian institution seeking to maintain the "purity" of the original Italian language
 Real Academia Española, Spanish Royal Academy, the institution responsible for regulating the Spanish language
 Swedish Academy, founded to further the "purity, strength, and sublimity of the Swedish language
See List of language regulators for complete list.

Arts, entertainment, and media

Awards
Academia de las Artes y las Ciencias Cinematográficas de España (Academy of Cinematographic Arts and Sciences, or AACCE), a Spanish organization responsible for the Goya Awards
 Academy of Motion Picture Arts and Sciences (AMPAS), an American organization responsible for the Academy Awards (Oscars)

Films
Academy (1996 film), an Australian film
 Academy (2007 film), a 2007 Japanese film

Music
 The Academy (EP), an EP by The Academy Is...
 The Academy, previous name for alternative rock band Elliot Minor
 The Academy Drum and Bugle Corps, Tempe, Arizona

Television
 The Academy (franchise), a Hong Kong television and film police drama franchise
 The Academy (Hong Kong TV series), the first series in the franchise from 2005
 The Academy (American TV series), a 2007–2008 American reality television series
 "Academy", an episode of the Max Headroom TV series
 "The Academy", a fifth-season episode of the fantasy television series, Hercules: The Legendary Journeys

Other uses in arts, entertainment, and media
 Academy (video game), a 1987 ZX Spectrum video game
 The Academy (periodical), a London periodical, 1869–1902, published as The Academy and Literature, 1902–1916
 Academy 1-2-3 (cinema), former art house cinema on Oxford Street, London; closed in 1986
 Academy Cinema, Bristol, cinema (1914–55) in Bristol, United Kingdom

Businesses
 Academia.edu, a repository of academic papers and social network for academics
 Academy Bus, bus company based in New Jersey
 Academy Music Group, owner-operator of British music venues (Carling academy)
 Academy Plastic Model Co., Korean scale model manufacturer
 Academy Sports and Outdoors, sporting goods store
 O2 Brixton Academy, a music venue in London commonly known as The Academy
 The Academy (Hotel), a London hotel located in the district of Bloomsbury
 The Academy (music venue), located in Dublin, Ireland

Places

United States
 Academy, St. Louis, Missouri
 Academy, South Dakota
 Academy Lake, a lake in South Dakota

Greenland
 Academy Fjord
 Academy Glacier (Greenland)
 Academy Glacier (NW Greenland)

Elsewhere
 Academy, Alberta Canada
 Academy Bay, Galapagos islands
 Academy Bay (Sea of Okhotsk)
 Academy Glacier, Antarctica

Other uses
 Academy (automobile), 1906–1908 British automobile
 The Academy (Heathsville, Virginia), US, a historic house
 House of Providence (Vancouver, Washington), commonly known as the Academy building
 National academy
 Youth academy, a youth development system attached to a sports club

See also

 Academia (disambiguation)
 Academic (disambiguation)
 The Academi, Welsh literary agency
 Academi, previously known as Xe Services LLC, Blackwater USA, and Blackwater Worldwide; a private military contractor
 Akademy, an annual contributors and users conference of the KDE community
 Royal Academy (disambiguation) for many institutions of this name